The International Association for Statistical Computing (IASC) was founded during the 41st Session of the International Statistical Institute (ISI) in 1977, as a Section of the ISI.

The objectives of the association are to foster worldwide interest in effective statistical computing and to exchange technical knowledge through international contacts and meetings between statisticians, computing professionals, organizations, institutions, governments and the general public.

The association is affiliated with the International Federation for Information Processing (IFIP). It publishes the journal called Computational Statistics & Data Analysis (CSDA) and Statistical Software Newsletter (CSDA SSN).

Past presidents
Mervin E. Muller (USA) 1977–1979
Sir Maurice Kendall (UK) and Wilfried J. Dixon (USA) 1979–1981
Ramanathan Gnanadesikan (India) 1981–1983 
Svein Nordbotten (Norway) 1983–1985
Klaus Neumann (GDR) 1985–1987
Masashi Okamoto (Japan) 1987–1989
John M. Chambers (USA) 1989–1991
Norbert Victor (Germany) 1991–1993
Natale Carlo Lauro (Italy) 1993–1995
Murray A. Cameron (Australia) 1995–1997
Edward J. Wegman (USA) 1997–1999
Lutz Edler (Germany) 1999–2001
Jae C. Lee (Korea) 2001–2003
Stanley P. Azen (USA) 2003–2005
Gilbert Saporta (France) 2005–2007
Jaromir Antoch (France) 2007–2009
Yutaka Tanaka (Japan) 2009–2011
Karen Kafadar (USA) 2011–2013
 Paula Brito (Portugal) 2013–2015
 Patrick Groenen (Netherlands) 2015–2017
 Wing Kam Fung (Hong Kong) 2017–2019
 Jürgen Symanzik (USA) 2019-2021
Current president
 Christophe Croux (France) 2021-2023

Notes

External links
International Association for Statistical Computing IASC home page
Computational Statistics & Data Analysis Journal home page

International Statistical Institute